Space Raiders are a British brand of corn and wheat snacks made by KP Snacks. Introduced in 1987, the alien shaped snacks are currently available in Beef, Pickled Onion, Saucy BBQ and Spicy flavours.

Pricing
Space Raiders were launched in 1987 at a retail price of 10 pence; this price remained until late October 2007, when it increased to 15p. It later increased to 25p before lowering to 20p. The price has continued to fluctuate, reflecting the volatility of the underlying commodity prices. At the time of the original 5p price rise, the company who owns Space Raiders are known as KP Snacks.

In October 2010 Space Raiders were relaunched in a new foil pack. These new packs were intended to 'increase shelf standout'. The ingredients were also changed. A new Saucy BBQ flavour variant was also announced. The packs were 20p each.

In 2019 the standard bag of Space Raiders was replaced with a new bigger 25 g pack with a RRP of 30p. The price marked packs feature a 'NEW BIGGER PACK!' banner.

Comics 
Until 2010 mini comic strips were featured on the back of the bags. They have over the years included the adventures of 'Astra and her Space Pirates' and stories of aliens being afraid of the crunching sounds from Space Raiders being eaten. Space Raiders now feature 4 different 'Space Raider Stats', one species for each flavour.

Varieties

Nutrition information

See also
 List of brand name snack foods

References 

Brand name snack foods
British snack foods
United Biscuits brands
Products introduced in 1987